Berkshire county cricket teams have been traced back to the 18th century but the county's involvement in cricket goes back much further than that.

17th century

As elsewhere in south east England, cricket became established in Berkshire during the 17th century and the earliest village matches took place before the English Civil War. It is believed that the earliest county teams were formed in the aftermath of the Restoration in 1660.

18th century
Berkshire had a leading county team in the 18th century, particularly in the period from c.1769 to 1795. The team is recognised as having first-class status during that time. The county organisation was centred on the Old Field aka Maidenhead Cricket Club which played at Old Field, Bray. This club was usually representative of the county.
 Noted Berkshire players included Thomas Waymark and George T. Boult.

19th century
The present Berkshire County Cricket Club was formed in 1895 but it has never had first-class status, always being a member of the Minor Counties Championship.

References

Bibliography
 
 
 

History of Berkshire
English cricket teams in the 18th century
Former senior cricket clubs
Cricket in Berkshire